Tim Gullikson and Tom Gullikson were the defending champions, but Tim Gullikson did not participate this year.  Tom Gullikson partnered Johan Kriek, losing in the final.

John Alexander and John Fitzgerald won the title, defeating Gullikson and Johan Kriek 7–5, 6–4 in the final.

Seeds

  Mark Edmondson /  Sherwood Stewart (semifinals)
  Tom Gullikson /  Johan Kriek (final)
  Victor Amaya /  Hank Pfister (first round)
  John Alexander /  John Fitzgerald (champions)

Draw

Draw

External links
 Draw

1983 Grand Prix (tennis)
1983 Bristol Open